Jean-Yves André (born May 31, 1977) is a Mauritian football player who currently plays for Cercle de Joachim in the Mauritian Premier League and for the Mauritius national football team as a midfielder. He is featured on the Mauritian national team in the official 2010 FIFA World Cup video game.

References 

1977 births
Living people
Mauritius international footballers
Mauritian footballers

Association football midfielders